Bankroll Mafia is the eponymously titled debut studio album by American hip hop collective Bankroll Mafia, composed of American rappers T.I.P., Young Thug, Shad da God, PeeWee Roscoe, Lil Duke and London Jae. The album was issued on April 22, 2016, by Grand Hustle Records and Empire Distribution. The album features guest appearances from fellow Atlanta-based rappers Bankroll Fresh, Young Dro, Lil Yachty, 21 Savage and Yung Booke, as well as Quavo and Offset of Migos. The album was supported by two singles, "Bankrolls on Deck" and "Out My Face".

Singles
"Bankrolls on Deck", which features verses from T.I.P., Young Thug, Shad da God and PeeWee Roscoe, was released July 20, 2015 as the album's first single. The official music video for "Bankrolls on Deck", directed by Kennedy Rothchild, was released prior on July 18. The album's second single, "Out My Face", showcasing members T.I.P., Shad da God, Young Thug and London Jae, was released January 2, 2016. The music video for "Out My Face" was released on April 18, 2016.

Track listing

Charts

References

2016 debut albums
T.I. albums
Young Thug albums
Bankroll Mafia albums
Albums produced by Lil' C (record producer)
Albums produced by London on da Track
Albums produced by Mars (record producer)
Empire Distribution albums
Southern hip hop albums
Trap music albums